Artiluc was a silver coin forged and used in the 17th century in the Republic of Ragusa that had its capital city in Dubrovnik, modern-day Croatia.

External links 

 Artiluk at lzmk.hr 
 https://web.archive.org/web/20061022035043/http://www.hnb.hr/novcan/povijest/h-nastavak-3.htm 

Economy of the Republic of Ragusa
Coins
Medieval currencies